Wang Jinshuai (born 9 January 2001) is a Chinese footballer who currently plays as a goalkeeper for Chinese Super League side Dalian Professional.

Club career 
Wang Jinshuai would play for Dalian Yifang (now known as Dalian Professional) youth team and was promoted to their U–19 team. To gain more playing time he would be loaned out to the China U19 team who were allowed to take part in the third tier of the Chinese pyramid. He would be loaned out again to the China U20 national team, who were allowed to play within the 2021 China League Two campaign. After his loan ended he would return to Dalian and go on to make his debut for them in a Chinese Super League game on 28 June 2022 against Guangzhou City F.C. in a game that ended in a 3-0 victory.

Career statistics 
.

References

External links

2001 births
Living people
Chinese footballers
Association football goalkeepers
Dalian Professional F.C. players